Bill or William France may refer to:

 Bill France Sr. (1909–1992), nicknamed "Big Bill", the founder of NASCAR and its president from 1948 to 1971
 Bill France Jr. (1933–2007), nicknamed "Little Bill", son of Bill France, Sr., who ran NASCAR from 1972 to 2000
 William France Sr. (cabinetmaker) (1727–1773)
 William France Jr. (cabinetmaker) (1759–1838)